The Pinera Tunnel (also known as the "No. 5 Tunnel") was a railroad tunnel on the Adelaide-Nairne Railway (now Belair railway line) in the Adelaide Hills that existed from 1883 to 1928.

History 
The former No. 5 Tunnel was a rail tunnel on the Belair railway line located beneath Main Road that connects the Adelaide Hills suburbs of Belair and Blackwood. It was the first ever railroad tunnel constructed in the Adelaide Hills region. Completed in 1881 as part of the first stage of the Adelaide-Nairne Railway (which formally opened in 1883), the tunnel was replaced by a bridge in 1928. On January 31, 1928, the tunnel was the site of a fatal rail construction accident while rail duplication work was underway and the tunnel was being replaced with a cutting. Six workers were killed when an estimated 150 tons (136 metric tonnes) of earth fell onto the tunnel site during heavy afternoon rains.

Construction 

All tunnels built along the Adelaide and Nairne Railway in the early 1880s were of the same specification being 16'6" (5.03m) high and 15' (4.57m) wide. The tunnel was lined with bricks that were made from clay excavated from an adjoining quarry and nearby railway cuttings, and fired at brickworks immediately south of the No. 3 Tunnel in Eden Hills

Gallery

References

External links 

Tunnels
Railway lines